Luigi Pintor (21 June 1882 – 3 September 1925) was an Italian jurist and politician. He had been governor of Cyrenaica from 1921 to 1922.

Before that, he had represented the Italian government at the negotiations with the Senussi that led to the accords of Acroma in 1917.

Notes

People from Cagliari
1882 births
1925 deaths
Italian colonial governors and administrators